Richard Bourke  (born 1965) is a UK-based Irish academic specialising in the history of political ideas. His work spans ancient and modern thought, and is associated with the application of the historical method to political theory. He is Professor of the History of Political Thought at the University of Cambridge, and a Fellow of King's College, Cambridge. He was formerly Professor of the History of Political Thought and Co-Director of the Centre for the Study of the History of Political Thought at Queen Mary, University of London. In July 2018 Bourke was elected a Fellow of the British Academy (FBA).

Life and career
Bourke grew up in Dublin, where he attended St. Kilian's German School. In 1986 he earned a BA in English and Philosophy at University College, Dublin. He then spent a year at St Catherine's College, Oxford, before taking up a research studentship at King's College, Cambridge, where he graduated with a PhD in 1990. Bourke subsequently earned a second BA in Classics at Birkbeck College, University of London.

After a three-year lectureship in Dublin, Bourke moved to Queen Mary, University of London where, in 2012, he became Professor in the History of Political Thought and Co-Director of the Centre for the Study of the History of Political Thought. In 2018 he was elected to the Chair in the History of Political Thought at the University of Cambridge. In 2022 he was awarded an honorary degree of Doctor of Arts by University College Dublin. Bourke has held various visiting fellowships in the United States, and was a Fellow of the Wissenschaftskolleg zu Berlin in 2014–15.

Bourke has published widely on the history of political thought, including on ancient political ideas and Enlightenment intellectual history. He has also published in Irish history, particularly on the political conflict in Northern Ireland. His work has engaged with a range of issues in historiography and political theory, including Romanticism, the Enlightenment, the Ancien Régime, political judgement, sovereignty, nationalism and democracy. He is currently working on the philosophy of history and writing a history of democracy. Bourke's Empire and Revolution: The Political Life of Edmund Burke was named a book of the year by several sources in 2015, including The Observer, The Spectator, and The Irish Times. According to the Royal Historical Society, the work "revolutionised" the way Burke has been viewed. Bourke has lectured around the world, and written for a variety of journals and newspapers including The Financial Times, The Times Literary Supplement, and The Nation.

Prizes

2017 Honourable Mention in the Association of American Publishers annual PROSE Awards for The Princeton History of Modern Ireland. 
2016 Choice Outstanding Academic Title for The Princeton History of Modern Ireland.
2015 Joint Winner of the István Hont Memorial Prize in Intellectual History.
2016 Book of the Year for The Princeton History of Modern Ireland in The Irish Times and RTÉ/Irish Booksellers. 
2016 Honourable Mention in the Association of American Publishers annual PROSE Awards for Empire and Revolution: The Political Life of Edmund Burke. 
2015 Book of the Year for Empire and Revolution: The Political Life of Edmund Burke in The Observer, The Irish Times, The Spectator, The Claremont Review of Books, RTÉ, The Indian Express, The National Review.
2005 Sir Christopher Ewart-Biggs Memorial Prize for Peace in Ireland: The War of Ideas (Final Short-List).
2000 Institute of Historical Research/Weidenfeld & Nicolson History Prize for Manuscript of Peace in Ireland: The War of Ideas (Final Short-list).

Works

Books
Empire and Revolution: The Political Life of Edmund Burke (Princeton University Press, 2015).

Peace in Ireland: The War of Ideas (Random House, 2003; 2nd edition with new Preface, 2012).

Romantic Discourse and Political Modernity (Simon & Schuster, Harvester: 1993).
(ed. with Quentin Skinner), History in the Humanities and Social Sciences (Cambridge University Press, 2023).
(ed. with Niamh Gallagher), The Political Thought of the Irish Revolution (Cambridge University Press, 2022).
(ed. with Ian McBride), The Princeton History of Modern Ireland (Princeton University Press, 2016).
(ed. with Quentin Skinner), Popular Sovereignty in Historical Perspective (Cambridge University Press, 2016).
(ed. with Raymond Geuss), Political Judgement: Essays for John Dunn (Cambridge University Press, 2009).

Film

(with Dina Gusejnova), Rosenöl und Deutscher Geist: The Fortunes of German Intellectual History.

Selection of articles and chapters

‘History and Normativity in Political Theory: The Case of Rawls’ in History in the Humanities and Social Sciences, eds. Richard Bourke and Quentin Skinner (Cambridge: Cambridge University Press, 2023).
‘Hegel and the French Revolution’, History of European Ideas, Published Online, 4 July 2022: https://doi.org/10.1080/01916599.2022.2095754.
‘Jon Elster’s “Enthusiasm and Anger in History”’,  Inquiry, 64:3 (2021), pp. 308–20.
‘Political and Religious Ideas of the Irish Revolution’, History of European Ideas, 46: 7 (2020), pp. 997–1008.
‘Material Incentives and Kantian Optimisation: John E. Roemer on “Left-Right” Economics’, Review of Social Economy, 77: 1 (2019), pp. 29–32.
‘Inventing Democracy’, Gerald Stourzh Lecture on Human Rights and Democracy, Online Publication (2018): http://www.univie.ac.at/gerald-stourzh-lectures.
‘What is Conservatism? History, Ideology and Party’, Journal of European Political Theory, 17: 4 (2018), pp. 449–75.
‘Reflections on the Political Thought of the Irish Revolution’, Transactions of the Royal Historical Society, 27 (2017), pp. 175–91.
‘Staryy poryadok i Revolyutsiya’ (The Old Regime and the Revolution), ФИЛОСОФИЯ (Philosophy: Journal of the Higher School of Economics), 1:1 (Moscow 2017), pp. 34–56.
‘She me shi jiu ti zhi?’, trans. into Chinese by Alvin Chen, Intellectual History 7 (Taipei: 2017), pp. 215–36.
‘Popular Sovereignty and Political Representation: Edmund Burke in the Context of Eighteenth-Century Thought’ in Popular Sovereignty in Historical Perspective, eds. Richard Bourke and Quentin Skinner (Cambridge: Cambridge University Press, 2016), pp. 212–35.
‘War Edmund Burke ein Konservativer? Notizen zum Begriff des Konservatismus’, Leviathan: Berliner Zeitschrift für Sozialwissenschaft, 44:1 (2016), pp. 65–96.
‘Edmund Burke als Aufklärer’, Zeitschrift für Ideengeschichte, 9: 3 (Autumn 2015), pp. 111–16.
‘Party, Parliament and Conquest in Newly Ascribed Burke Manuscripts’, Historical Journal, 55:3 (September 2012), pp. 619–52.
‘Burke, Enlightenment and Romanticism’ in The Cambridge Companion to Burke, eds. David Dwan and Chris Insole (Cambridge: Cambridge University Press, 2012), pp. 27–40.
‘Pity and Fear: Providential Sociability in Burke's Philosophical Enquiry’ in The Science of Sensibility: Reading Edmund Burke's Philosophical Enquiry, eds. Michael Funk Deckard and Koen Vermeir (Dordrecht, New York, Heidelberg and London: Springer, 2012), pp. 151–75.
‘Languages of Conflict and the Northern Ireland Troubles’, Journal of Modern History, 83:3 (September 2011), pp. 544–78.
‘Nationalism, Balkanization and Democracy’ in Schleifspuren: Lesarten des 18. Jahrhunderts, eds. Anke Fischer-Kattner et al.  (Munich: Dreesbach Verlag, 2011), pp. 77–89.
‘Pocock and the Presuppositions of the New British History’, Historical Journal, 53:3 (September 2010), pp. 747–70; reprinted in Critical Concepts in Historical Studies: Intellectual History, ed. Richard Whatmore (London: Routledge, 2015).
‘Theory and Practice: The Revolution in Political Judgement’ in Political Judgement: Essays for John Dunn, eds. Richard Bourke and Raymond Geuss (Cambridge: Cambridge University Press, 2009), pp. 73–110.
‘Enlightenment, Revolution and Democracy’, Constellations, 15:1 (March 2008), pp. 10–32.
‘Edmund Burke and the Politics of Conquest’, Modern Intellectual History, 4:3 (November 2007), pp. 403–32.
‘Antigone and After: "Ethnic" Conflict in Historical Perspective’, Field Day Review, 2 (2006), pp. 170–96.
‘Edmund Burke and Enlightenment Sociability: Justice, Honour and the Principles of Government’, History of Political Thought, 21:4 (2000), pp. 632–55.
‘Liberty, Authority and Trust in Burke's Idea of Empire’, Journal of the History of Ideas, 61:3 (Summer 2000), pp. 453–471; reprinted in International Library of Essays in the History of Social and Political Thought: Edmund Burke, ed. Iain Hampsher-Monk (Aldershot: Ashgate, 2009), pp. 117–35.
‘Sovereignty, Opinion and Revolution in Edmund Burke’, History of European Ideas, 25:3 (1999), pp. 99–120.

References

External links

Richard Bourke's University of Cambridge Web Page
King's College, Cambridge Web Page
British Academy Web Page
Interviews with Richard Bourke
Film on German Intellectual History
Articles for Unherd
Unionism and Partition Lecture
Cambridge Inaugural Lecture

1965 births
Living people
Alumni of University College Dublin
Academics of Queen Mary University of London
Alumni of Birkbeck, University of London
Alumni of King's College, Cambridge
Fellows of the British Academy